Cupedora is a genus of air-breathing land snail, a terrestrial pulmonate gastropod mollusk in the family Camaenidae.

Species 
Species within the genus Cupedora include:
 Cupedora broughami
 Cupedora evandaleana
 Cupedora luteofusca
 Cupedora marcidum
 Cupedora nottensis
 Cupedora sutilosa
 Cupedora tomsetti

References 

 Nomenclator Zoologicus info

 
Camaenidae
Taxonomy articles created by Polbot